NGC 2363-V1 is a luminous blue variable star in the star-forming region NGC 2363, at the far southwestern part of the irregular galaxy NGC 2366 in the constellation Camelopardalis, near the north celestial pole nearly 11 million light years away from our galaxy. It was discovered in 1996 by Laurent Drissen, Jean-René Roy, and Carmelle Robert while examining images taken by the Hubble Space Telescope Wide Field Planetary Camera 2.

NGC 2363-V1 is one of the most luminous stars known.  It has been undergoing an increase in temperature and luminosity for the last 20 years, after a dramatic increase in its rate of mass loss.  Significant luminosity variation within a human lifetime is rare in LBVs, e.g. Eta Carinae during its Great Eruption (1837 to 1855). NGC 2363-V1 shows an extreme B hypergiant spectrum similar to P Cygni rather than the presently cool Eta Carinae outburst spectrum.

References

Stars in NGC 2366
Camelopardalis (constellation)
Luminous blue variables
Extragalactic stars